The Kasari is a river in western Estonia that drains into the Matsalu Bay which is part of Väinameri. There is a 308-metre-long pedestrian bridge over it which was built in 1904 and was the longest concrete bridge in Europe at the time. The river itself is 112 km long, and is the fourth longest river in Estonia. The river is a home to a variety of fish, including pike and roach.

References

Kasari
Landforms of Lääne County
Landforms of Rapla County